Sergey Zabolotsky (born 17 February 1983) is a retired Belarusian professional footballer.

References

External links 
 Profile at teams.by
 
 

1983 births
Living people
Belarusian footballers
Belarusian expatriate footballers
Expatriate footballers in Russia
Association football forwards
FC Gomel players
FC Khimik Svetlogorsk players
FC ZLiN Gomel players
FC Rechitsa-2014 players
FC DSK Gomel players
FC Slutsk players
FC Lokomotiv Gomel players
FC Sputnik Rechitsa players
People from Svietlahorsk District
Sportspeople from Gomel Region